Elmo is a male given name, derivative of Erasmus, via the old Italian diminutive Ermo.

It can also be a diminutive form of the given name Guglielmo.

People with this name

Saint Elmo
 Erasmus of Formiae (Saint Elmo), the patron saint of sailors
 Peter González, also known as Saint Elmo or Saint Telmo

Others
 St. Elmo Brady (1884–1966), the first African American to obtain a Ph.D.
 Elmo Fernando (died 2016), Sri Lankan Sinhala journalist and radio announcer
 Elmo Hope (1923-1967), American jazz pianist
 Elmo Kassin (born 1969), Estonian cross-country skier
 Elmo Langley (1928-1996), longtime safety car driver in NASCAR
 Elmo McClain (1917-1972), American politician
 Elmo Nüganen (born 1962), Estonian theatre director, film director, and actor
 Elmo Kennedy O'Connor (born 1994), American rapper, known professionally as Bones
 Elmo Noel Joseph Perera (1932–2015), 5th Bishop of the Roman Catholic Diocese of Galle
 Elmo Rodrigopulle (1941–2021), Sri Lankan cricketer
 Elmo Shropshire (born 1936), singer of the novelty holiday song "Grandma Got Run Over by a Reindeer"
 Elmo Stoll (1944–1998), American writer and religious leader, was a prominent former Old Order Amish bishop who founded the "Christian Communities"
 Elmo Tiisvald (born 1967),  Estonian conductor
 Elmo Russell Zumwalt, Jr. (1920–2000), American naval officer

Fictional characters
 Elmo, a Muppet character on the television show Sesame Street, and the basis for the children's toy Tickle Me Elmo
 Elmo, an infantry sergeant in Glen Cook's The Black Company novel series
 Elmo Putney, a character in the television show Brush Strokes
 Elmo, a character in the Advanced Dungeons & Dragons module, The Temple of Elemental Evil

See also
Elmer
Elmo (disambiguation)
Saint Elmo (disambiguation)
San Telmo (disambiguation)

References

Masculine given names
Italian masculine given names 
English masculine given names
Estonian masculine given names